Scaphoideus festivus is a species of leafhopper in the family Cicadellidae.

References

Insects described in 1902
Scaphoideini